Bunty Aur Babli is a 2005 Indian Hindi-language crime comedy film directed by Shaad Ali and written by Jaideep Sahni, based on a story by Aditya Chopra, who serves as producer under the Yash Raj Films banner. The film stars Abhishek Bachchan and Rani Mukerji as the titular leads, along with Amitabh Bachchan, marking the first motion picture starring the Bachchan father-son duo together. The younger Bachchan and Mukerji play con-artist partners-in-crime, Bunty and Babli, while the elder Bachchan plays DCP Dashrath Singh, whose focus is solely to catch them. The soundtrack of Bunty Aur Babli was composed by Shankar–Ehsaan–Loy, with lyrics written by Gulzar and Blaaze together, and was released under the banner YRF Music. 

Bunty Aur Babli released worldwide on 27 May 2005, and proved to be a commercial success at the box-office, grossing ₹63.74 crore worldwide, thus becoming the third highest-grossing Indian film of 2005. It received positive reviews from critics upon release, with praise for its direction, novel story, screenplay, soundtrack, humor, costumes, styling and performances of the cast.

At the 51st Filmfare Awards, Bunty Aur Babli received 8 nominations, including Best Film, Best Actor (Abhishek Bachchan), Best Actress (Mukerji) and Best Supporting Actor (Amitabh Bachchan) and won 3 awards – Best Music Director (Shankar–Ehsaan–Loy), Best Lyricist (Gulzar) and Best Female Playback Singer (Alisha Chinai), the latter two for the song "Kajra Re" in which the leads of the song Abhishek and Aishwarya started dating shortly after. 

A sequel under the title of Bunty Aur Babli 2, starring Rani Mukerji, Saif Ali Khan, Siddhant Chaturvedi and Sharvari Wagh was released theatrically on 19 November 2021.

Plot 
Rakesh Trivedi (Abhishek Bachchan) is from a small village named Fursatganj. His father is a ticket collector on a train and wants him to get into a similar occupation as well. However, Rakesh has big dreams; he is forever coming up with new business schemes and is convinced he will make it big one day. He adamantly refuses any notion that he will one day work in a 9-to-5 environment. Rakesh's father gives him an ultimatum – go on the job interview he has arranged or get out of the house.

Vimmi Saluja (Rani Mukerji) is the daughter of a Punjabi family in another small village named Pankinagar; she spends her hours watching films and studying supermodels and dreams of becoming Miss India. However, Vimmi's parents tell her they have arranged her marriage to a young man with a decent job which she is not interested in.

Rakesh and Vimmi pack their bags and sneak out in the dark of night. They bump into each other at a train station and become friends after realizing their stories are similar. They support and encourage each other to achieve their dreams: Vimmi tries to enter the Miss India contest but gets thrown out after an argument. Rakesh tries to sell his ideas for an investment scheme, but a businessman turns him away. In fact, a man he had met at a restaurant stole ideas from Rakesh's presentation file and, when he enters the office, the interviewer states someone before he came in with the same idea. After finding out that the businessman who Rakesh had approached, used his idea to make money, he and Vimmi con him and take the money they believe is rightfully theirs.

Once they realize how easy it is to con people, they decide to run some more cons to raise money to make it to Bombay.

Unfortunately, they find the lifestyle too exciting to give up. Adopting the names of 'Bunty' and 'Babli', they successfully pull off con after con, looting the rich dressed as local guides, religious priests, health inspectors, business partners, etc. Their flamboyant antics make them famous in newspapers nationwide. Soon their friendship leads to romance and they decide to continue conning as husband and wife.

Little do Bunty and Babli know that DCP Dashrath Singh (Amitabh Bachchan) is catching up with their cons, getting closer each day. He relentlessly pursues them across India in the hopes of putting them behind bars. To complicate matters, Bunty and Babli have a child and, after a very close call eluding Dashrath, they decide to quit conning for their child's sake. This decision leads to their capture by Dashrath. While in custody, their heartfelt confessions and conversation soften the policeman's heart and he lets them go, certain he had destroyed Bunty and Babli's career as criminals.

Three years later, Dashrath rescues Bunty and Babli from their mundane domestic lives by offering them to work for the nation thwarting the activities of other scammers.

Cast 

 Amitabh Bachchan as DCP Dashrath Singh
 Abhishek Bachchan as "Bunty" / Rakesh Trivedi
 Rani Mukerji as "Babli" / Vimmi Saluja
 Raj Babbar as T. T. Chandra P. Trivedi, Bunty's father
 Talluri Rameshwari as Mrs. Trivedi, Bunty's mother
 Puneet Issar as Mr. Saluja, Babli's father
 Kiran Juneja as Mrs. Saluja, Babli's mother
 Pratima Kazmi as Phool Sakhi
 Prem Chopra as a Truck Driver
 Sanjay Mishra as Q. Q. Qureshi
 Brijendra Kala as Mehmood Bilal
 Ravi Baswani as a Hotel Owner in Mussoorie
 Virendra Saxena as Police Commissioner
 Yunus Parvez as a Hotel Owner
 J. Brandon Hill as Harry Epstein 
 Tania Zaetta as Kate
 Anupam Shyam as Raj Kapoor Tiwari
 Rajesh Vivek as a Protestor
 Kunal Kumar as Newspaper Salesman
 Ranjeet as Showroom Manager
 Rajiv Gupta as a Police Inspector
 Shiamak Davar in a special appearance in song 'Nach Baliye'
 Marzi Pestonji as a background dancer in 'Nach Baliye'
 Shaad Ali in a guest appearance in title song
 Antara Biswas in a guest appearance in title song
 Lilliput as Band Trumpet Player
 Aishwarya Rai Bachchan as a bar dancer (guest appearance) in the song 'Kajra Re'
 Sushant Singh Rajput as an uncredited background dancer behind Abhishek Bachchan in the song ‘Nach Baliye’

Reception 
The film was a critical and commercial success, becoming the second highest-grossing Indian film of the year. Designer Aki Narula dressed Mukerji a new look Patiala salwars and kurtis, which became popular.

Influence 
The glorification of crime in the movie inspired many people to emulate the glamorous couple, resulting in a trend of real-life Buntys and Bablis.

One such case is that of Sushant and Kajal, a married couple who conned two businesses out of money using a photo frame. The Darjeeling-based couple did a 'Bunty Aur Babli' on their victims, and were caught and arrested.

Another case of the movie's influence on crime is that of another married couple, Suresh and Rekha. Their crimes also mirrored those committed in the film, and they admitted to committing the crimes they were accused of in a "Bunty Aur Babli" style.

Yet another couple, a sister and brother-in-law, were caught for crimes that mirrored those committed in the film. Shahnaaz Bano and Sajid Ahmed were caught smuggling and shoplifting diamonds and other expensive merchandise out of stores, using disguises.

Soundtrack 

The soundtrack was composed by the musical trio Shankar–Ehsaan–Loy and was released on 13 April 2005 by Yash Raj Music. Initially, A. R. Rahman was approached to compose the film's music, having worked on Ali's previous film Saathiya (2002), but he declined due to his date issues. The lead actors Abhishek Bachchan and Rani Mukerji danced to the tunes of the album. The lyrics were penned by Gulzar and Blaaze. According to the Indian trade website Box Office India, with around 19,00,000 units sold, this film's soundtrack album was the year's second highest-selling.

Track listing 
Lyrics by Gulzar except where noted.

Reception 
The music of Bunty Aur Babli received positive reviews from critics. Sukanya Verma of Rediff, said in her review, "On the whole, the music of Bunty Aur Babli, with its over-the-top, uninhibited, rustic and teasing spices, makes for one helluva musical masala." Planet Bollywood's review concluded, "Overall, Shankar-Ehsaan-Loy do an excellent job of getting different singers for each track, trying to infuse different beats together and creating an album worth buying. It’ll take a few listens to pick your favourites, but its fresh and an above-average album to own. Enjoy!" "Bunty Aur Babli does not contain your routine Yash Chopra genre of music that are choreographed around the meadows and Swiss alps. They are more of situational rhythmic tracks that take a story forward" Joginder Tuteja of Bollywood Hungama said in his review. Glamsham was full of praise for the lyrics by Gulzar, "Throughout this zany, zingy and zippy album, the 70-year-old Gulzar imbues a youthfulness that comes from being young at heart. Indeed that's the quality, which flows freely out of this album. You can't miss its zest for life… or its lunge towards a luscious nirvana obtained from looking at life through rose-tinted glasses." Avijit Ghosh wrote in The Telegraph, "In essence, Bunty Aur Babli is an on-the-road flick about a boy and girl in search of fun and freedom rather than a story of two cons. To capture the splintered yearnings of smalltown India which watches Aastha channel in the morning and FTV at night is a difficult and ambitious task. But like his protagonists, director Ali pulls it off. Bravely. Almost."

Legacy 
"Kajra Re" was voted as the best of 2005 overwhelmingly by listeners of 3 radio stations catering for South African Indians.

Hidekaz Himaruya, the manga artist who created Hetalia, embedded the video of "Dhadak Dhadak" on his blog around Christmas time, which caused a sudden influx of Himaruya fans commenting on the video.

Accolades

Sequel 

In December 2019, Yash Raj Films announced a sequel, Bunty Aur Babli 2, to be directed by Varun V. Sharma and produced by Aditya Chopra. The film stars Saif Ali Khan, Rani Mukherji, Siddhant Chaturvedi and debutante Sharvari Wagh as the leads, and was scheduled to be released on 26 June 2020, but postponed due to COVID-19 pandemic. It released theatrically on 19 November 2021. Although the film is direct sequel and takes places after 16 years of the first film but the character of Bunty is portrayed by Saif Ali Khan replacing Abhishek Bachchan.

Notes

References

External links 
 

2000s crime comedy films
2000s Hindi-language films
2005 comedy films
2005 films
Films about con artists
Films directed by Shaad Ali
Films scored by Shankar–Ehsaan–Loy
Films set in Kanpur
Films set in Uttar Pradesh
Films shot in Lucknow
Films shot in Mussoorie
Indian comedy road movies
Indian crime comedy films
Yash Raj Films films